Hell Scroll may refer to:

 Hell Scroll (Nara National Museum)
 Hell Scroll (Tokyo National Museum)